David Knoller is a television producer, director and writer who has worked on several TV series including Carnivàle, Power, Big Love, Freaks and Geeks, and Lovecraft Country.

Early life and education

David Knoller grew up in Los Angeles, California.  He is a graduate of California State University, Northridge.

Career

Knoller has worked on several TV series, including Carnivàle, Power, Big Love, Freaks and Geeks, Alan Ball's Here and Now and is the executive producer of a new HBO series pilot  Lovecraft Country.  He received both a CableACE and NAACP Image Award for Best Dramatic Special for the period film America's Dream, along with Golden Globe and Emmy nominations for Big Love.

Personal life

Knoller is married to Emmy Award winning producer Wendy Knoller.

References

External links

American television producers
American television directors
Living people
Year of birth missing (living people)